The Salmagundi Club, sometimes referred to as the Salmagundi Art Club, is a fine arts center founded in 1871 in the Greenwich Village section of Manhattan, New York City. Since 1917, it has been located at 47 Fifth Avenue. , its membership roster totals roughly 1,250 members.

The Salmagundi Club has served as a center for fine arts, artists and collectors, with art exhibitions, art classes, artist demonstrations, art auctions and many other types of events. It is also a sponsor of the United States Coast Guard Art Program (COGAP).

History
It was founded in 1871. Originally called the New York Sketch Class, and later the New York Sketch Club, the Salmagundi Club had its beginnings at the eastern edge of Greenwich Village in sculptor Jonathan Scott Hartley's Broadway studio, where a group of artists, students, and friends at the National Academy of Design, which at the time was located at Fourth Avenue and Twenty-third Street, gathered weekly on Saturday evenings.

The club formally changed its name to The Salmagundi Sketch Club in January 1877. The name has variously been attributed to salmagundi, a stew which the group has served from its earliest years, or to Washington Irving's Salmagundi Papers.

Growing rapidly, the organization was housed in a series of rented properties including 121 Fifth Avenue, 49 West 22nd Street, 40 West 22nd Street and finally 14 West Twelfth Street, where it remained for 22 years. In April 1917, following a three-year search, the club purchased Irad and Sarah Hawley's 1853 Italianate-style brownstone townhouse at 47 Fifth Avenue between East Eleventh and East Twelfth Streets from the estate of William G. Park for $100,000.00 and erected a two-story annex in the rear at an additional cost of $20,000.00 to house its primary art gallery and a billiard room. A housewarming event on February 5, 1918 was attended by more than 500 persons. In 1918, the club spearheaded a national effort to produce range-finder paintings used to train military gunners for World War I. The club provided the canvas and painting materials for these special-purpose paintings.

In 1969 the building was designated a city landmark by the New York City Landmarks Preservation Commission. In 1975 it was added to the National Register of Historic Places.

Membership
The Salmagundi Club was a male-only club for its first century, although artworks by women were accepted and praised. A sister club for women artists, the Pen and Brush Club, was formed around the corner from Salmagundi in 1894. Salmagundi began admitting women members in 1973.

Members of the Salmagundi Club have included Thomas P. Barnett, William Richardson Belknap, Alon Bement, Ralph Blakelock, A. J. Bogdanove, Charles Bosseron Chambers, James Wells Champney, William Merritt Chase, C.K. Chatterton, Frederick Stuart Church, Jay Hall Connaway, John Henry Dolph, Charles Dana Gibson, Gordon H. Grant, Walter Granville-Smith, Edmund Greacen, Charles P. Gruppé, Emile Gruppe,  William Hart, Childe Hassam, Ernest Martin Hennings, Harry Hoffman, Alexander Pope Humphrey, George Inness Jr., Lajos "Louis" Jambor, John LaFarge, Ernest Lawson, Austin W. Lord, Frank Mason, Leopold Matzal, Samizu Matsuki, John Francis Murphy, Spencer Baird Nichols, Richard C. Pionk, Howard Pyle, Will J. Quinlan, Norman Rockwell, Harry Roseland, Augustus Saint-Gaudens, Rudolph Schabelitz, Leopold Seyffert, Channel Pickering Townsley, Louis Comfort Tiffany, Edward Charles Volkert, J. Alden Weir, Jack Wemp, Stanford White, William Wilson (physicist), Stuart Williamson, Joseph Mortimer Lichtenauer and N.C. Wyeth.

Honorary members have included Paul Cadmus, Schuyler Chapin, Winston Churchill, Buckminster Fuller, Al Hirschfeld, and Thomas Hoving.

Salmagundi curatorial committee is responsible for maintaining Salmagundi’s permanent representational art collection of approximately 1,800 works from the 1840s to today, including: paintings, sculpture, objects and works on paper by its past and present artist members.

The collection consists of exhibition purchase prizes, competition purchase prizes, artist donations, and estate bequests.

The works are rotated on a continual basis throughout the townhouse and are featured in live shows and online exhibitions throughout the year.

 Joseph Hartley, 1871–1889
 George W. Maynard, 1888–1889
 Charles Yardley Turner, 1883–1889
 Thomas Moran, 1893–1896
 W. Lewis Fraser, 1896–1897
 Alexander Theobald Van Laer, 1897–1898
 Robert C. Minor, 1898–1899
 Alexander Theobald Van Laer, 1899–1900
 George H. McCord, 1900–1901
 George Inness Jr., 1901–1903
 J. Scott Hartley, 1903–1905
 Alexander Theobald Van Laer, 1905–1908
 Henry B. Snell, 1908–1910
 Frank Knox Morton Rehn, 1910–1911
 Carleton Wiggins, 1911–1913
 Charles Vezin, 1913–1914
 F. Ballard Williams, 1914–1919
 Emil Carlsen, 1919–1920
 J. Massey Rhind, 1920–1922
 Hobart Nichols, 1922–1924
 W. Granville-Smith, 1924–1926
 Franklin De Haven, 1926–1929
 Bruce Crane, 1929–1933
 Louis Betts, 1933–1935
 George Elmer Brown, 1935–1937
 Frederick W. Hutchinson, 1937–1939
 Gordon Grant, 1939–1941
 George Lober, 1941–1944
 Frederick K. Detwiller, 1944–1946
 Henry O' Connor, 1946–1947
 Silvio B. Valerio, 1947–1949
 Percy Albee, 1949–1953
 Russell Rypsam, 1953–1955
 Henry Laussucq, 1955–1957
 Junius Allen, 1957–1959
 A. Henry Nordhausen, 1959–1963
 Francis Vandeveer Kughler, 1963–1966
 Martin Hannon, 1966–1970
 John N. Lewis, 1970–1976
 Martin Hannon, 1976–1977
 Raymond R. Goldberg, 1977–1979
 Richard Clive, 1979–1981
 Carl L. Thomson, 1981–1983
 Ruth B. Reininghaus, 1983–1987
 Edward A. Brennan, 1987–1990
 Kenneth W. Fitch, 1990–1991
 Robert Volpe, 1991–1994
 Richard C. Pionk, 1994–2007
 Claudia Seymour, 2007–2013
 Robert Pillsbury, 2013–2019
 Elizabeth Spencer, 2019-2021
 Jacob Collins, 2021 -

References

External links

 
 Salmagundi Museum of American Art
 Documenting the Gilded Age: New York City Exhibitions at the Turn of the 20th Century A New York Art Resources Consortium project. Exhibition catalogs from the Salmagundi Club.
 The Salmagundi Club Photograph Collection at the New York Historical Society
 Salmagundi Club: David John Gue

1871 establishments in New York (state)
American artist groups and collectives
Arts organizations established in 1871
Clubhouses on the National Register of Historic Places in Manhattan
Cultural infrastructure completed in 1852
Greenwich Village
Italianate architecture in New York City
New York City Designated Landmarks in Manhattan
Non-profit organizations based in New York (state)